The 2022–23 Croatian Football Cup is the 32nd season of Croatia's football knockout competition. It is sponsored by the betting company SuperSport and known as the SuperSport Hrvatski nogometni kup for sponsorship purposes. The defending champions are Hajduk Split, having won their 7th title the previous year by defeating their rivals Rijeka in the final.

For the first time ever clubs in the Croatian cup will be financial supported through to television and sponsorship rights, with total fund of 1,225,000 kuna (c. 162,000 euros).

Calendar

Participating clubs
The following 48 teams qualified for the competition:

Preliminary round
The draw for the preliminary single-legged round was held on 19 July 2022 and the matches were scheduled on 31 August 2022.

First round 
The draw is determined according to the principle of opposite numbers, which are assigned based on the club coefficient. The matches are scheduled on 19 October 2022.

* Match played on 27 September.
** Match played on 12 October.
*** Matches played on 18 October.

Second round 
The draw is determined according to the principle of opposite numbers, which are assigned based on the tie number. The matches are scheduled on 9 November 2022.

* Match played on 2 November.
** Matches played on 8 November.
*** Match played on 14 February 2023.

Quarter-finals
The quarter-finals were scheduled for 1 March 2023.

* Match played on 28 February.

Semi-finals
The semi-finals are scheduled for 5 and 12 April 2023, while the draw was held on 6 March 2023.

Final

The final will be played on 24 May 2023. On 27 February 2023 it was decided that Rijeka will be host of a final at Stadion Rujevica.

Top scorers 
Players in bold are still active in competition.

Updated on 1 March 2023

References

Croatian Football Cup seasons
Croatia
Croatian Cup, 2022-23